Reach or REACH may refer to:

Companies and organizations 
 Reach plc, formerly Trinity Mirror, large British newspaper, magazine, and digital publisher 
 Reach Canada, an NGO in Canada
 Reach Limited, an Asia Pacific cable network company
 The Reach Foundation, a charitable organization in Australia
 REACH (Singapore), a department under the Ministry of Communications and Information of Singapore

Video games 
 Halo: Reach, a 2010 video game in the Halo series set on the fictional planet Reach
 Park Jung-suk (gamer) or Reach, professional StarCraft player

Music

Albums
 Reach (Eyes Set to Kill album) (2008)
 Reach (Meredith Edwards album) (2001)
 Reach (Survivor album) (2006)
 Reach (Jacky Terrasson album) (1995)

Songs
 "Reach" (Gloria Estefan song), the 1996 Summer Olympics official song
 "Reach" (Eyes Set to Kill song) (2008)
 "Reach" (Nightwish song) (2007)
 Reach, a 2005 song by Caleigh Peters 
 "Reach" (S Club 7 song) (2000)
 "Reach", a song by Collective Soul from Hints Allegations and Things Left Unsaid
 "Reach", a 2011 song by Peter Furler from On Fire
 "Reach", a 1982 song by Martini Ranch
 "The Reach", a 1981 song by Dan Fogelberg from The Innocent Age
 "Reach", a 1976 song by the band Orleans
 "Reach", a 2016 song by Neurosis from Fires Within Fires

Places 
 Reach, Ontario, in Canada
 Reach, Cambridgeshire, a village in England

Other 
 Reach (advertising), a measure of the size of an audience
 Reach (brand), a brand of oral hygiene products
 Reach (comics), a fictional alien race in the DC Comics universe
 Reach (geography), an expanse, or widening, of a stream or river channel
 Reach (mathematics), a geometric property of a set
 "The Reach", a 1981 short story by Stephen King
 The Reach Gallery Museum, Abbotsford, British Columbia, Canada
 Beyond the Reach (working title The Reach), a 2014 film starring Michael Douglas
 Canal reach, the section of a canal between two locks
 Registration, Evaluation, Authorisation and Restriction of Chemicals (REACH), a European Union regulation
 Arm span, or reach, measured from fingertip to fingertip, important in boxing, basketball
 Reachability or reach, the st-connectivity problem
 Dutch Reach, a car door-opening method to reduce the likelihood of dooring
 Isuzu Reach, a 2011–present American walk-through delivery van

See also 
 Reaching (disambiguation)